Frithsden  is a small hamlet in Hertfordshire, England.  It is located in the Chiltern Hills, about two miles north  of Berkhamsted, to which it belongs. It is in the Dacorum Ward of Nettleden with Potten End.

The village name is derived from the wood le Fryth (me. frith »wood«). It is first mentioned 1291 as Frithesdene (»valley of the wood«).

It is pronounced locally as 'Frizden'

West of the hamlet bordering to Ashridge Park are the Frithsden Beeches, a wood left to nature, with large beeches. Scenes for Sleepy Hollow, Jonathan Creek and Harry Potter and the Goblet of Fire have been filmed in this wood.

Frithsden, together with the neighbouring hamlets Nettleden and Potten End, is famous for its black cherries and the villagers hold in July their annual cherry fair. They also claim to have originated the Cherry Bounce and the Cherry Turnover. The village has also a winery, the Frithsden Vineyard.

References

External links

  A Guide to Old Hertfordshire webpage for Frithsden

Hamlets in Hertfordshire
Dacorum